Elisabeth of Hesse may refer to:

 Elisabeth of Hesse-Marburg (1466–1523), daughter of Henry III, Landgrave of Upper Hesse and wife of John V of Nassau-Dillenburg
 Elisabeth of Hesse (1502–1557), daughter of William II, Landgrave of Hesse
 Elisabeth of Hesse (1503–1563), daughter of William I, Landgrave of Lower Hesse and wife of Louis II, Count Palatine of Zweibrücken
 Elisabeth of Hesse (1539–1582), daughter of Philip I, Landgrave of Hesse and married George, Duke of Saxony
 Landgravine Elisabeth Amalie of Hesse-Darmstadt (1635–1709), daughter of George II, Landgrave of Hesse-Darmstadt and wife of Philip William, Elector Palantine
 Elisabeth Henriette of Hesse-Kassel (1661–1683), daughter of William VI, wife of Frederick I of Prussia

See also
 Princess Elisabeth of Hesse and by Rhine (disambiguation)